Middle Bay may refer to:

 Middle Bay (Dominica)
 Middle Bay (Hong Kong)